Eisenach is a town in Thuringia, Germany.

Eisenach may also refer to:

 Eisenach, Rhineland-Palatinate, a municipality in the district of Bitburg-Prüm, Rhineland-Palatinate, Germany
 Eisenach station, the main station of the city of Eisenach, Thuringia, Germany
 10774 Eisenach, an asteroid

People
 Franz Eisenach (1918–1998), German Luftwaffe fighter ace 
 James C. Eisenach, American anesthesiologist  
 Jeffrey Eisenach, American economist